Elias Havel (born 16 April 2003) is an Austrian professional footballer who plays as a  striker for 2. Liga club Liefering.

Career statistics

Club

Honours
FC Liefering

Runner-up
 Austrian Football First League: 2021
Notes

References

2003 births
Living people
Austrian footballers
Austria youth international footballers
Association football forwards
2. Liga (Austria) players
1. Simmeringer SC players
First Vienna FC players
FK Austria Wien players
FC Red Bull Salzburg players
FC Liefering players